On Sunday 3 August 1969 an Antonov An-24 operating Aeroflot Flight N-826 ( Reys N-826 Aeroflota) crashed resulting in the death of all 55 people on board. An investigation revealed the cause of the accident was an in flight failure of the propeller attached to "No. 1" (left) engine.

Accident
Flight N-826 was a scheduled passenger flight from Voroshilovgrad to Lviv with stops at Dnipropetrovsk and Vinnytsia. At 15:47 the aircraft departed  Dnipropetrovsk. At 15:58 the crew reported an altitude of 3,600 meters and received permission from ATC to climb to 4,200 meters. This was the last radio transmission from flight 826. While climbing through 4,000 meters, the number two propeller blade of the left engine separated from its hub and punctured the fuselage severing control rods for the ailerons and rudder rendering the Antonov uncontrollable. Because of the imbalance, the left air screw was detached. The aircraft then banked to the left and entered a descent with its airspeed increasing. After a steep spiral, the airliner struck the ground at an angle of 45-50 degrees and at a speed of 500-550 km/h. At 16:06 ATC tried to communicate with flight 826 but received no answer. All further attempts at communication with the AN-24 were unsuccessful.

Aircraft
The aircraft involved was an Antonov An-24B, serial number 77303206 and registered as CCCP-46248. The airliners production date was 23 March 1967 and at the time of the crash, it had a total of 4,557 flight hours with 4,789 landings.

Investigation
Investigators discovered the propeller blade failed due to mechanical fatigue and the presence of a corrosive material.

See also
Aeroflot accidents and incidents
Aeroflot accidents and incidents in the 1960s

References

Aviation accidents and incidents in the Soviet Union
Aviation accidents and incidents in 1969
1969 in the Soviet Union
N-826
1969 in Ukraine
Accidents and incidents involving the Antonov An-24
Airliner accidents and incidents caused by mechanical failure
Aviation accidents and incidents in Ukraine
History of Dnipropetrovsk Oblast